Sergio Damián Valenti (born 30 June 1985, in La Plata) is an Argentine footballer, who currently plays for Italian Promozione side Tempio.

References

1985 births
Living people
Argentine footballers
Argentine expatriate footballers
Footballers from La Plata
Association football forwards
Club de Gimnasia y Esgrima La Plata footballers
Talleres de Córdoba footballers
Irapuato F.C. footballers
Defensor Sporting players
Club Sportivo Ben Hur players
Curicó Unido footballers
Club Atlético Villa San Carlos footballers
Defensores de Cambaceres footballers
UAI Urquiza players
A.D. Berazategui footballers
Argentino de Quilmes players
CA Excursionistas players
San Martín de Burzaco footballers
Argentine expatriate sportspeople in Uruguay
Argentine expatriate sportspeople in Chile
Argentine expatriate sportspeople in Italy
Expatriate footballers in Uruguay
Expatriate footballers in Chile
Expatriate footballers in Italy